Greg Estandia (born November 18, 1982 in Moorpark, California) is a former American football tight end. He was originally signed by the Cincinnati Bengals as an undrafted free agent in 2006. He played college football at Nevada-Las Vegas.

Estandia has also played for the Jacksonville Jaguars.

External links
Jacksonville Jaguars bio
UNLV Rebels bio

1982 births
Living people
Players of American football from California
American football tight ends
UNLV Rebels football players
Cincinnati Bengals players
Jacksonville Jaguars players
Cleveland Browns players
People from Moorpark, California
Sportspeople from Ventura County, California